The Dog is a 1992 American short film that Todd Field and Alex Vlacos created on the side while making Victor Nuñez's Ruby in Paradise.

One of Field's earliest works, it is an experimental piece about a bible-toting fundamentalist wandering through the bikini clad bodies of Panama City, Florida.

References

External links 
 

1992 short films
1992 films
Films directed by Todd Field
American short films
1990s English-language films